Léon Van Dievoet (5 July 1907 – 6 December 1993) was a Belgian architect, painter, engraver, and draughtsman.

He is the author of numerous drawings of places in Brussels that have since been demolished which have been described as a "mine of information for all those interested in the Brussels of yesteryear".

Selected works

Honours 

  Knight of the Order of Léopold
  Knight of the Order of the Crown

Notes and references

Further reading 
 1930-1931 : Annuaire général des beaux-arts de Belgique, Brussels, 1930–31, p. 192 : « Projet d'hôtel ».
 1933 : Jean Groffier, « Un interview. L'architecte Léon Van Dievoet », in : La momie chante. Arts, Sciences, Lettres, Bruxelles, juillet 1933, p. 2.
 2003 : Dictionnaire de l'Architecture en Belgique de 1830 à nos jours, direction : Anne Van Loo, Antwerp : Fonds Mercator, 2003, p. 562.
 2003 : Paul Piron, « VAN DIEVOET, Léon », in Dictionnaire des artistes plasticiens de Belgique des XIXe et XXe siècles, Ohain-Lasne, 2003, volume L-Z, p. 619.

Belgian architects
Belgian painters
Belgian engravers
Van Dievoet family
1907 births
1993 deaths
20th-century engravers